
The following is a list of Playboy Playmates of 1961.  Playboy magazine names its Playmate of the Month each month throughout the year.

January

Connie Cooper (born September 20, 1941) is an Italian-American model.  She was Playboy magazine's Playmate of the Month for its January 1961 issue. Her centerfold was photographed by Paul Morton Smith.

According to The Playmate Book, she also attended college courses to study real estate and later became a wife and mother.

February

Barbara Ann Lawford (born October 7, 1942) is an American model.  She was Playboy magazine's Playmate of the Month for its February 1961 issue.  Her centerfold was photographed by Mario Casilli. She also appeared on the cover of the September 1961 issue.

March

Tonya Crews (born Alice Crews; February 2, 1938 – August 7, 1966) was a Choctaw American model.  She was Playboy magazine's Playmate of the Month for its March 1961 issue. Her centerfold was photographed by Mario Casilli. Crews died in an automobile accident in 1966.

April

Nancy Nielsen (born December 14, 1940) is an American model.  She was Playmate of the Month for its April 1961 issue. Her centerfold was photographed by Lawrence Schiller.

May

Susan Kelly (born February 15, 1938) is an American model and actress.  She was Playboy magazine's Playmate of the Month for its May 1961 issue. Her centerfold was photographed by Frank Bez.

June

Heidi Becker (born October 11, 1940) is an Austrian-born model.  She was Playboy magazine's Playmate of the Month for its June 1961 issue. Her centerfold was photographed by Mario Casilli. In December 1979 she again posed semi-nude for Playboy for the "Playmates Forever!" pictorial. Becker attended the University of Wisconsin.

July

Sheralee Conners (born December 12, 1941) is an American model.  She was Playboy magazine's Playmate of the Month for its July 1961 issue. Her centerfold was photographed by William Crespinal and Sherman Weisburd. Conners also was the model for the unusual double-sided cover of the December 1962 issue.

August

Karen Thompson is an American model and actress.  She was Playboy magazine's Playmate of the Month for its August 1961 issue. Her centerfold was photographed by Mario Casilli.

September

Christa Speck (August 1, 1942 – March 22, 2013) was a German model. She was Playboy magazine's Playmate of the Month for September 1961, and the 1962 Playmate of the Year. Her original pictorial was photographed by Sam Wu. Her centerfold is seen in the 1978 film Animal House, which takes place in 1962.

Speck married TV producer Marty Krofft.

October

Jean Cannon (October 5, 1941 – November 17, 2005) was an American model.  She was Playboy magazine's Playmate of the Month for its October 1961 issue. Her centerfold was photographed by Ron Vogel. She died on November 17, 2005, in Pembroke Pines, Florida.  Her cause of death was not disclosed, but according to The Playmate Book, she had been diagnosed with terminal cancer in 2002.

November

 
Dianne Danford (born August 9, 1938) is an American model. She was Playboy magazine's Playmate of the Month for its November 1961 issue. Her centerfold was photographed by Mario Casilli. In 1966, she appeared in a horror film, Weekend of Fear, directed, written and produced by Joe Danford.

December

Lynn Karrol (born July 31, 1939) is an American model. She was Playboy magazine's Playmate of the Month for its December 1961 issue. Her centerfold was photographed by Frank Eck.

See also
 List of people in Playboy 1960–1969

References

1961-related lists
1961
Playmates Of 1961